Taotao ( c. 1972 – April 2, 2008) was a Chinese giant panda. Taotao was China's oldest living giant panda at the time of her death at the age of 36.

Taotao was born in the wild in Gansu province, and in October 1994 was brought to the zoo in Jinan in the Shandong province. Taotao never gave birth in captivity, despite the efforts of researchers and zoo keepers.

Taotao was considered to be one of the Jinan Zoo's star attractions and was seen by millions of visitors from 1994 to 2008. The Jinan Zoo reportedly bestowed the title of "ambassador of harmonious zoology" on Taotao.

Taotao died from brain thrombus and a cerebral hemorrhage on April 2, 2008, at the Jinan Zoo. She had been in declining health since the brain thrombus disease was discovered in February 2008. Taotao lived far beyond the average life expectancy of a giant panda, who usually live to the age of 25 years. Taotao's remains will reportedly be returned to Gansu province.

As of 2008, over 200 of the giant pandas that are native to China live in captivity around the world.

References

1972 animal births
2008 animal deaths
Individual giant pandas
Individual animals in China